Jerry Hale (January 20, 1936 – December 18, 2014) was an American college basketball coach who served as head coach for the College of Southern Idaho and Oral Roberts University.

Hale played college basketball for Henry Iba at Oklahoma A&M University (now Oklahoma State University) where he was a three-year starter. After playing two seasons for the Peoria Caterpillars, Hale began his coaching career at Dumas High School in Texas. He moved to the college ranks as an assistant to Don Haskins at UTEP, before becoming head coach at the junior college College of Southern Idaho. After five seasons and a 161–22 record, Hale was named head coach at Oral Roberts. Hale coached three seasons at Oral Roberts, compiling a record of 61–21. He resigned following the 1976–77 season, despite his .744 winning percentage at the school.

Hale's son Steve played college basketball at North Carolina under Dean Smith.

Hale died on December 18, 2014, after a battle with Alzheimer's disease.

Head coaching record

Senior college

References

1936 births
2014 deaths
American men's basketball coaches
Basketball coaches from Oklahoma
Basketball players from Oklahoma
College men's basketball head coaches in the United States
Neurological disease deaths in the United States
Deaths from Alzheimer's disease
High school basketball coaches in Texas
Oklahoma State Cowboys basketball players
Oral Roberts Golden Eagles men's basketball coaches
Peoria Caterpillars players
Southern Idaho Golden Eagles men's basketball coaches
UTEP Miners men's basketball coaches